Protestant Irish Nationalists are adherents of Protestantism in Ireland who also support Irish nationalism. Protestants have played a  large role in the development of Irish nationalism since the eighteenth century, despite most Irish nationalists historically being from the Irish  Catholic majority, as well as most Irish Protestants usually tending toward unionism in Ireland. Protestant nationalists (or patriots, particularly before the mid-19th century) have consistently been influential supporters and leaders of various movements for the political independence of Ireland from Great Britain. Historically, these movements ranged from supporting the legislative independence of the Parliament of the Kingdom of Ireland, to a form of home rule within the United Kingdom of Great Britain and Ireland, to complete independence in an Irish Republic and (since the partition of Ireland) a United Ireland.

Despite their relatively small numbers, individual Protestants have made important contributions to key events in Irish nationalist history, such as Wolfe Tone during the 1798 rebellion, Charles Stewart Parnell and the Home Rule movement, and Erskine Childers and the 1916 Easter Rising.

In Northern Ireland, the vast majority of Ulster Protestants are unionist and vote for unionist parties. In 2008, only 4% of Protestants in Northern Ireland thought the long-term policy for Northern Ireland should be unification with the Republic of Ireland, whereas 89% said it should be to remain in the United Kingdom.

All the various denominations of Protestantism in Ireland have had members involved in nationalism. The Anglican Church of Ireland and the Presbyterian Church of Ireland are the largest Protestant churches, and this remains the situation across the island of Ireland. The largest Protestant denomination is the Church of Ireland (having roughly 365,000 members, making up around 3% of the population of the Republic of Ireland, 15% of Northern Ireland, and 6.3% of the whole of Ireland), followed by the Presbyterian Church, with a membership of around 300,000, accounting for 0.6% of people in the Republic and 20% in Northern Ireland (6.1% of Ireland's population).

Pre-Union background

In the eighteenth century the first attempt towards a form of greater Irish home rule under the British Crown was led by the Irish Patriot Party in the 1770s and 1780s, inspired by Henry Grattan.

The Age of Revolution inspired Protestants such as Wolfe Tone, Thomas Russell, Henry Joy McCracken, William Orr, Lord Edward Fitzgerald, the brothers Sheares, Archibald Hamilton Rowan, Valentine Lawless, and others who led the United Irishmen movement. At its first meeting on 14 October 1791, almost all attendees were Presbyterians, apart from Tone and Russell who were both Anglicans. Presbyterians, led by McCracken, James Napper Tandy, and Neilson would later go on to lead Ulster Protestant and Catholic Irish rebels in the Irish Rebellion of 1798. Tone did manage to unite if only for a short time, at least, some Anglicans, Catholics and Dissenters into the "common name of Irishmen", and would later go on to try to get French support for a rising, first manifested in the failed French Bantry Bay landing of 1796.

At that time, the French republicans were opposed to all churches. Such people were inspired by Thomas Paine of the American Revolution, who disapproved of organised religions in The Age of Reason (1794–1795) and preferred a deist belief. Although the United Irish movement was supported by individual priests, the Roman Catholic hierarchy was opposed to it, because of a growing rapprochement between Rome and London (one example of which was the funding of the new seminary in Maynooth by the British government in 1795).

During the 1798 rebellion the military leaders were also largely Anglicans. After the initial battles in County Kildare the rebels holding out in the Bog of Allen were led by William Aylmer. In Antrim and Down the rebels were almost all Presbyterians, and at the Battle of Ballynahinch the local Catholic Defenders decided not to take part. In County Wexford, which remained out of British control for a month, the main planners were Bagenal Harvey and Anthony Perry. Joseph Holt led the rebels in County Wicklow, and Sir Edward Crosbie was hanged, having been wrongfully accused of leading a rebel force in County Carlow. Only in County Mayo, where there were few Protestants, was the rebellion led entirely by Catholics, and it only developed there because of the landing by a French force under General Humbert, who was assisted by Captain Bartholomew Teeling. The disarming of Ulster saw several hundred Protestants tortured, executed and imprisoned for their United Irish sympathies. The rebellion became the main reason for the Acts of Union, which passed in 1800.

From Emmet to the Fenians
In 1803 Robert Emmet, brother of Thomas Addis Emmet, attempted an insurrection in Dublin. Jemmy Hope tried to raise the districts of the north where the Presbyterian spirit of republican resistance had run strongest in the 1790s, but found no response.  

The democratic and non-violent Repeal Association led by Daniel O'Connell in the 1830s and 1840s was supported by a number of Protestants; the most eminent being John Gray, who later supported Butt and Parnell (see below), and others such as James Haughton. Several younger Protestant Repealers, grouped around Charles Gavan Duffy's paper, the Nation, were disaffected: wary of O'Connell's ready identification of Catholicism with the nation, and of the broader clericalism of the national movement. Referred to contemptuously by O'Connell as "Young Irelanders"--a reference to Giuseppe Mazzini's Young Italy which in 1849 had briefly imposed a republic on the Pope in Rome--they included Thomas Davis, John Mitchel and leader of the abortive 1848 rebellion William Smith O'Brien.

In 1845 Davis famously clashed with O'Connell over "the Liberator's" denunciation of the "Queens Colleges", a "mixed" or non-denominational scheme for advanced education in Ireland. When Davis pleaded that "reasons for separate education are reasons for [a] separate life", O'Connell accused him of suggesting it a "crime to be a Catholic". "I am", he declared, "for Old Ireland, and I have some slight notion that Old Ireland will stand by me".

In the election of 1852 John Gray, then editor of the Freeman's Journal, at the urging of the Reverend David Bell stood on the platform of Tenant Right League in Monaghan. Bell found his appeals for unity in support of Gray could not prevail against calls of the Union in danger, and "No Popery". Of the 100 of his fellow Presbyterians who had signed the requisition asking Gray to stand, only 11 had the courage to vote for him. Despairing of constitutional means, in 1864 Bell was inducted into the Irish Republican ["Fenian"] Brotherhood by Jeremiah O'Donovan Rossa. Escaping arrest, from 1865 he was in exile in the United States where, in contrast to John Mitchel who, already in Ireland, had defended American slavery against the abolitionism of Daniel O'Connell, Bell tried to associate physical-force Irish republicanism with the Radical [U.S.] Republican agenda of black enfranchisement and Reconstruction.

Home Rule era (1870–1914)

Politicians

The new Home Government Association was founded by Isaac Butt in 1870, who died in 1879. William Shaw presided over the convention held to found its successor, the Home Rule League, of which he was chairman. He was followed by Charles Stewart Parnell, the founder of the Irish Parliamentary Party (IPP). H. H. Asquith called Parnell one of the most important men of the nineteenth century and Lord Haldane called him the most powerful man that the Parliament of the United Kingdom of Great Britain and Ireland had seen in 150 years. Parnell led the Gladstonian constitutionalist Home Rule movement and for a time dominated Irish and British affairs. However, at the height of his power he was to be dethroned by the O'Shea divorce affair and died soon afterwards.

Other Protestant Nationalist members of parliament were: Sir John Gray, Stephen Gwynn, Henry Harrison, Jeremiah Jordan, William McDonald, J. G. Swift MacNeill, James Maguire, Pierce Charles de Lacy O'Mahony, Isaac Nelson, John Pinkerton, Horace Plunkett and Samuel Young.

In 1903, with Thomas Sloan, Independent MP for South Belfast, R.Lindsay Crawford co-founded the Independent Orange Order. For Crawford, who became the new order's Grand Master, this, in the first instance, was a protest against co-optation of the established Orange Order by the Ulster Unionist Party and its alignment with the interests of landlords and employers. But he also saw it as an opportunity for Irish Protestants to "reconsider their position as Irish citizens and their attitude towards their Roman Catholic countrymen".  His commitment in the Magheramorne Manifesto (1904) to an "extended form of self-government" for Ireland proved too much for Sloan and his supporters, and Crawford was expelled. As a journalist in Canada and the United States Crawford was committed to the cause of Irish self-determination, and in the 1920s served as the Irish trade representative in New York.

Several Protestant figures in the early Northern Ireland Labour Party were nationalists. These included MPs Jack Beattie, Sam Kyle and William McMullen and labour leaders James Baird and John Hanna.  Meanwhile, trade unionist Victor Halley was a member of the Socialist Republican Party.

Artists

While not active nationalist supporters, authors who wrote about Irish life and history, such as William Wilde, Whitley Stokes, Standish James O'Grady and Samuel Ferguson helped to develop nationalist sentiment.

From 1897 the artist and mystic George Russell (also known as "Æ") helped Horace Plunkett to run the Irish Agricultural Organisation Society. The IAOS rapidly grew into the main Irish rural co-operative body through which Irish farmers could buy and sell goods at the best price. Plunkett was also a cousin of George Noble Plunkett, father of Joseph Mary Plunkett. Horace Plunkett's home in County Dublin was later burned down in 1922 by anti-treaty Irish republicans during the Irish Civil War, as he had been appointed a Senator in the first Irish Free State Senate.

Russell was also involved in the "Irish Literary Revival" (or Celtic Twilight) artistic movement, that provided an intellectual and artistic aspect supportive of Irish nationalism. This was also largely started and run by Protestants such as WB Yeats, Lady Gregory, Seán O'Casey, Alice Milligan, and JM Synge, who also founded the influential but controversial Abbey Theatre that opened in 1904. "An Túr Gloine" (The Glass Tower) had a similar membership.

The archetypal work of art that commemorated the 1916 Rising, though sculpted five years before the rising, is the statue of the dying mythical warrior Cuchullain, sculpted by Oliver Sheppard, a Protestant art lecturer in Dublin who had been a moderate nationalist for decades. Cast in bronze, it was unveiled at the GPO in 1935.

Independence era (1916–1922)

Sam Maguire inducted Michael Collins into the Irish Republican Brotherhood (IRB) in 1909. From 1928 the main prize for Irish football awarded by the Gaelic Athletic Association has been the Sam Maguire Cup.

In 1908 Bulmer Hobson and Constance Markievicz founded the Fianna Éireann, intended as a nationalist Boy Scout movement. The Irish Volunteers were a paramilitary organisation established in 1913 by Irish Nationalists and separatists including Roger Casement, Bulmer Hobson and Erskine Childers, all Protestant Irish nationalists (although Casement, who had been secretly baptised a Catholic by his mother, officially converted to Catholicism just before he was hanged in 1916). The Irish Volunteers were formed in response to the formation of the Ulster Volunteers by Edward Carson and James Craig. The Ulster Volunteers were a Unionist paramilitary movement who feared a Dublin-centric, anti-Protestant Home Rule parliament in Dublin.

The Irish Citizen Army existed from 1913–1947 and one of its creators was Jack White from Ulster, son of General George White. On Easter Monday, 24 April 1916, 220 of the group (including 28 women) took part in the Easter Rising. Most of the rifles and ammunition used in the Rising had been imported from Germany in July 1914 by Erskine Childers on his yacht Asgard along with Conor O'Brien, Alice Stopford Green, Mary Spring Rice, Darrell Figgis and the former Quaker Bulmer Hobson. The rest of the rifles were shipped by Sir Thomas Myles, at the suggestion of the barrister James Meredith, and were landed at Kilcoole. In 1913 Hobson had sworn Patrick Pearse into the IRB; Pearse was one of leaders of the Rising. A prominent signatory to the Anglo-Irish Treaty in late 1921 that followed the Anglo-Irish war was Robert Barton, a cousin of Childers.
A cousin of both, David Lubbock Robinson, was in the IRA and interned. He later became a Fianna Fáil Senator.

In the subsequent Irish Free State governments Ernest Blythe, a former member of the Irish Volunteers, held various ministerial posts. Seán Lester was a League of Nations diplomat. The founder of the Gaelic League and first President of Ireland was Douglas Hyde. Dorothy Macardle opposed the 1921 Treaty and was a lifelong supporter of Éamon de Valera, writing his view of history in The Irish Republic (1937), but also refusing his suggestion to convert to Catholicism on her deathbed in 1958. Some like the Revd. Robert Hilliard fought in the Spanish Civil War in 1936–1939.

Following independence, southern Protestant unionists accepted the new reality and worked with the new Free State from its difficult start in 1922–23. These included judges such as Lord Glenavy, whose suggestions for a new law courts system was enacted as the Courts Act 1924, and twenty accepted nominations to the new Senate, such as Lord Mayo.

1940s
In 1941, writer Denis Ireland, son of a wealthy manufacturer and steeped in Unionist tradition, described himself as "a son of the Ulster Protestant industrial ascendancy". He founded the Ulster Union Club in Belfast to purportedly "recapture, for Ulster Protestants, their true tradition as Irishmen", it advertised a range of activities including weekly discussions and lectures on current affairs, economics, history and the Irish language, as well as dancing and music classes. A number of pamphlets were published and under its auspices Ireland contributed to various magazines, newspapers and radio programmes in Belfast and Dublin.

The Club was mainly frequented by Protestants but, as the authorities soon discovered, it was a source of recruits to the IRA. UUC meetings were being attended by John Graham, a devout member of the Church of Ireland, who, at the time of his arrest in 1942, was leading a "Protestant squad", an intelligence unit, that was preparing the armed organisation for a new "northern campaign." In 1944, under Northern Ireland Special Powers Act, the UUC was suppressed. The club's premises, and the homes of Ireland and other prominent members (among them Presbyterian clergymen, teachers and university lecturers) were raided by RUC Special Branch.

Along with George Gilmore, and George Plant, Graham had been amongst a handful of Protestants who had come to the IRA through the minority Republican Congress. Plant was executed in 1942 by the Irish government for the murder of a suspected informer.

In 1948 Denis Ireland entered the Seanad Éireann, the Irish Senate, for the republican and social-democratic Clann na Poblachta. As a senator, Ireland was the first member of the Oireachtas, the Irish Parliament, to be resident in Northern Ireland.

During the Troubles
In the North, Protestants participated in the early years of the nationalist Social Democratic and Labour Party (SDLP). Ivan Cooper was among its co-founders in 1970.

Billy Leonard, a former Seventh-day Adventist lay-preacher and Royal Ulster Constabulary (RUC) reservist, whose wife and children are Catholics, was elected in 2001 to Coleraine Borough Council as an SDLP representative for the Skerries area. Citing lack of emphasis on Irish unity he joined Sinn Féin in 2004. The party nominated him to succeed Francie Brolly as an MLA for East Londonderry in 2010. But citing disagreements "over support arrangements for MLAs' wages and expenses", and complaining that "the tentacles of the [IRA] Army Council still run throughout" the republican party he soon resigned.

Ronnie Bunting, son of Ronald Bunting, a close associate of Ian Paisley, became a member of the Official IRA in the early 1970s and was a founder-member of the Irish National Liberation Army (INLA) in 1974. He was assassinated by the Ulster Defence Association in 1980.

Also assassinated by the UDA in 1980, John Turnley, scion of a wealthy Protestant family and a former British Army officer, joined in SDLP in 1972. At the time he was killed, Turnley was chairman of the Irish Independence Party, co-founded with Frank McManus (former Unity MP for Fermanagh & South Tyrone) and Fergus McAteer (son of the former Nationalist Party leader Eddie McAteer)., and a leading member of the National H-Blocks Committee supporting the IRA blanket protest.

David Russell was a Protestant Provisional IRA volunteer originally from Ramelton in Donegal and a Presbyterian. He was killed due to a premature bomb explosion in 1974 at a supermarket in Derry. Tom Berry was an Official IRA volunteer with Protestant background. He was killed by the Provisional IRA in east Belfast during the intra-republican feud in 1975. Harry Murray was a Provisional IRA volunteer from Tiger's Bay.

Republic of Ireland
Martin Mansergh, a member of the Church of Ireland, has been influential in formulating Fianna Fáil's policy on Northern Ireland since the peace process began in the 1990s. Sinn Féin TD for Clare Violet-Anne Wynne is Protestant. Fine Gael TD Heather Humphreys has referred to herself as a republican and nationalist on several occasions.

Protestant nationalist converts to Roman Catholicism
A number of Protestant nationalists also converted to Catholicism, for a variety of reasons:

 Lord Ashbourne
 Ada Beesley, the second wife of John Redmond
 Thomas Bennett
 Charles Bewley
 Joseph Biggar MP
 Aodh de Blácam (né Harold Blackham)
 Roger Casement
 Lillie Connolly, widow of James Connolly
 Charlotte Despard, sister of Viscount French (Lord Lieutenant of Ireland 1918–21)
 Victor Fagg, prominent Irish republican (converted to Catholicism in 1943 to marry Una Daly, a member of the women's IRA group, Cumann na mBan)
 Father Patrick Fell, a Roman Catholic convert accused and later convicted in the 1970s of being a commander of an Provisional Irish Republican Army (IRA) active service unit; later became a priest.
 Mabel McConnell FitzGerald, wife of Desmond FitzGerald and mother of Garret FitzGerald
 Grace Gifford, sister of Muriel, wife of Joseph Plunkett
 Katherine Anna ("Katie") Gifford, Mrs Wilson (1875–1957), Irish republican, civil servant, and teacher; sister of Grace and Muriel Gifford
 Muriel Gifford, sister of Grace, wife of Thomas MacDonagh
 Maud Gonne, wife of John MacBride, mother of Seán MacBride, and mother-in-law of Francis Stuart
 Edmund Dwyer Gray, son of the Protestant nationalist, Sir John Gray
 Hugh Law MP and TD
 Shane Leslie
 Seán Mac Stíofáin, born John Edward Drayton Stephenson in England to an English Protestant father and a mother of Ulster Protestant and Unionist.
 Constance Markievicz MP (abstentionist) and TD, first female elected as both
 Pierce Charles de Lacy O'Mahony MP
 Gertrude Bannister Parry (cousin of Roger Casement)
 James Pearse, father of Patrick and Willie Pearse; converted to Catholicism (and, at least nominally, Home Rule) before marrying Margaret Brady (who, with her daughters, shared her sons' political beliefs and all became political activists) 
 William Stockley
 Francis Stuart, son-in-law of Maud Gonne

See also
Alliance Party of Northern Ireland
Catholic Unionist
Unionism in Ireland
Irish Unionist Party

References

Sources
 O'Broin, Leon; Protestant Nationalists in Revolutionary Ireland, Barnes & Noble 1985, 

 
Celtic nationalism
Irish nationalism
Politics of Northern Ireland